Budzynek  is a village in the administrative district of Gmina Dalików, within Poddębice County, Łódź Voivodeship, in central Poland.

The village has a population of 140.

References

Budzynek